Bir Shrestha Hamidur Rahman Stadium (Bangla: বীর শ্রেষ্ঠ হামিদুর রহমান স্টেডিয়াম) is district stadium of Jhenaidah, Bangladesh. The stadium is located by the Pria Cinema Hall of Jhenaidah municipality. The stadium is mostly used for national day parade and district level football and cricket leagues.

Hosting National Sporting Event 
The venue was the zonal host of 3rd National Football Championship from June 18- July 1 in 2003.

See also
 Stadiums in Bangladesh
 List of cricket grounds in Bangladesh
 Sheikh Kamal International Stadium, Cox's Bazar
 Sheikh Kamal International Stadium, Gopalganj

References

Football venues in Bangladesh